is a former justice of the Supreme Court of Japan.

References

Supreme Court of Japan justices
1938 births
Living people